Granville railway station is a train station located on the Main Suburban line, serving the suburb of Granville, New South Wales, Australia. It is served by Sydney Trains T1 Western Line and T2 Inner West & Leppington Line services. It is the junction for the Main Western line and the Main South line.

History

Granville station opened on 2 July 1860 as Parramatta Junction, and is close to the original terminus of the first railway line in New South Wales which was completed in 1855. On 1 September 1880 it was relocated to its present location and renamed Granville.

Granville Junction lies immediately to the west of the station and is the junction point of the Main Western and the original Main South lines, now referred to as the Old Main South after the opening of the Lidcombe to Cabramatta bypass.

As part of the quadruplication of the Main Suburban line from Lidcombe, the station was rebuilt in the 1950s.

On the station's northern side lay a parcel's dock and siding. This was removed in August 1990.

Granville has traditionally served as a transfer station, a role that has been diluted since the construction of a 'Y-link' track between the neighbouring Harris Park and Merrylands stations. Since 1996, this track has allowed direct travel between the Main Western and Main South lines via the Cumberland Line.

Platforms and services

Transport links
Transdev NSW operates three routes via Granville railway station:
906: Parramatta station to Fairfield station
M91: Parramatta station to Hurstville
S2: to Sefton

Granville station is served by one NightRide route:
N60: Fairfield station to Town Hall station

Trackplan

References

External links

Granville station details Transport for New South Wales
Granville Station Public Transport Map Transport for NSW

Easy Access railway stations in Sydney
Railway stations in Sydney
Railway stations in Australia opened in 1860
Railway stations in Australia opened in 1880
Main Southern railway line, New South Wales
Main Suburban railway line
New South Wales Heritage Database
Granville, New South Wales
Main Western railway line, New South Wales